Andrew Maatla Motsomi  is a Botswana economist and corporate executive, who serves as the managing director and chief executive officer of Debswana Diamond Company Limited, the largest diamond-mining company in the world, by value. He was appointed to that position in May 2022 on a five-year contract. He assumed office on 1 June 2022.

Background and education
Motsomi is a Motswana by birth. He holds a bachelor's degree in Economics and Accounting from the University of Botswana. He went on to obtain a  Postgraduate Diploma in Economic Development and Planning from the African Institute for Economic Development and Planning in Dakar, Senegal. His degree of Master of Arts  in economics was obtained from the Victoria University of Manchester.

Career
In 2016, the President of Botswana at the time, Ian Khama, appointed Motsomi as Deputy Governor of the Bank of Botswana, effective 1 February 2016. While at the bank, he represented Botswana regionally as the chairman of the Botswana Institute for Development Policy Analysis. He also worked on attachment at the International Monetary Fund on behalf of Botswana. His tenure at Bank of Botswana exceeded 35 years of service.

Motsomi took over the helm of Debswana from Lynette Armstrong, the substantive chief financial officer (CFO) at the company, who served as the CEO of the company in acting capacity between August 2019 until May 2022.

See also
Bogolo Kenewendo

References

External links
 Debswana Homepage
 Race for BoB top post ensues as new Deputy Governor is appointed As of 8 February 2016.

Living people
Year of birth missing (living people)
Botswana businesspeople
Botswana economists
Botswana chief executives
University of Botswana alumni
Alumni of the Victoria University of Manchester